Golovin or Golovina (feminine; Головина) is a Russian surname, derived from the word голова (golova, meaning "head" and probably referring to the head of a household or village). The surname may refer to:

Alexis Golovin (born 1945), Russian pianist
Aleksandr Golovin (artist) (1863–1930), Russian artist 
Aleksandr Golovin (footballer) (born 1996), Russian football player
Aleksei Golovin (born 1981), Russian football player
Alexander Golovin (ice hockey) (born 1983), Russian ice hockey player
Alexander Vasiliyevich Golovin (born 1949), Russian diplomat
Anastasia Golovina (1850–1933), Bulgarian doctor
Boris Golovin (born 1955), Russian musician
Elena Golovina (born 1961), Russian athlete
Fyodor Alexeyevich Golovin (1650–1706), Russian politician
Fyodor Alexandrovich Golovin (1867–1937), Russian politician
Julia Golovina (born 1982), Ukrainian ice dancer
Luba Golovina (born 1990), Georgian trampolinist
Nikolai Golovin (1875–1944), Russian historian
Pavel Golovin (1909–1940), Russian pilot
Tatiana Golovin (born 1988), French tennis player
Varvara Golovina (1766–1819), Russian artist 
Vladimir Golovin (born 1970), Hungarian handball player and coach
Yevgeny Golovin (1782–1858), Russian general

See also
Golovin (disambiguation)
Golovnin (surname)

References

Russian-language surnames